Gustavo Goulart (born September 26, 1989) is a Brazilian actor and singer.

He started his career at four years old, with films and series in his country of origin (Brazil), and also overseas, in many different countries. He had some roles at Rede Globo as an actor, but decided to focus on his international career.

As a singer, his discography has two albums: Estúdio A: My First (2006 – original songs), and Southern Chords: Worldwide Hits (2016 – cover songs), both distributed worldwide and available in online music stores and streaming services.

The filmography below is partial. It contains only the most important films and TV series in which Gustavo has worked in each year of his career. It displays only one (or some) of his functions in each job, as he often works in several functions in the same project.

Filmography

Television

Film

References

1989 births
Living people
Male actors from São Paulo
Brazilian male television actors
Brazilian male telenovela actors
Brazilian male film actors
Brazilian male stage actors